The 2004–05 Deutsche Eishockey Liga season was the 11th season since the founding of the Deutsche Eishockey Liga. The Eisbären Berlin became first time German Champion, a feat they will repeat a number of times in the next seasons. The Kassel Huskies was allowed to stay in the league, despite losing the play-down, as Grizzly Adams Wolfsburg lost its DEL license.

The season was significant, due to the NHL lockout. 22 NHL players came to play the season in the DEL, with the Iserlohn Roosters making the first move by signing up Mike York. Several German national team players came as well -- Marco Sturm, Jochen Hecht and Olaf Kölzig. Other significant signings included Stéphane Robidas and Doug Weight midseason signups for the previous season champion the Frankfurt Lions. Erik Cole, who would have been playing with the Carolina Hurricanes, was named MVP of the playoffs with the Eisbären Berlin.

Regular season
The regular season was played from September 17, 2004 to March 13, 2005.

GP = Games played; GF:GA = Goals for and against
Color code:  = Direct Playoff qualification,  = Playoff qualification round,  = No playoff

Playdowns
The two last placed, Grizzly Adams Wolfsburg and Kassel Huskies played a "playdown" in a Best-of-seven series starting March 18, 2005.

The Kassel Huskies were set to be relegated to the 2. Bundesliga, but due to the Grizzly Adams losing their DEL license, they were allowed to stay.  The Grizzly Adams lost the license as their new Arena was not finished in time, and the old one did not conform to the DEL rules.

Playoffs

References

Deutsche Eishockey Liga seasons
DEL
DEL